Schefflera leucantha is a species of flowering plant in the family Araliaceae and is native to south-central and southeast China, Laos and Vietnam.

References 

leucantha
Plants described in 1909